The Chinese Ambassador to Lesotho is the official representative of the People's Republic of China to the Kingdom of Lesotho.

History
In 1966, Lesotho declared independence.
From 31 October 1966 to 14 May 1983 and from 5 April 1990 to 24 December 1993, the Republic of China (ROC) and Lesotho maintained diplomatic relations. 
From 30 April 1983 to 7 April 1990, the People's Republic of China (PRC) and Lesotho maintained diplomatic relations.
Since 12 January 1994 the People's Republic of China (PRC) and Lesotho maintain diplomatic relations.

List of representatives

References 

 
Lesotho
China